In ecology, the foundation species are species that have a strong role in structuring a community.  A foundation species can occupy any trophic level in a food web (i.e., they can be primary producers, herbivores or predators). The term was coined by Paul K. Dayton in 1972, who applied it to certain members of marine invertebrate and algae communities. It was clear from studies in several locations that there were a small handful of species whose activities had a disproportionate effect on the rest of the marine community and they were therefore key to the resilience of the community. Dayton’s view was that focusing on foundation species would allow for a simplified approach to more rapidly understand how a community as a whole would react to disturbances, such as pollution, instead of attempting the extremely difficult task of tracking the responses of all community members simultaneously. The term has since been applied to a range of organisms in ecosystems around the world, in both aquatic and terrestrial environments. Aaron Ellison et al. introduced the term to terrestrial ecology by applying the term foundation species to tree species that define and structure certain forest ecosystems through their influences on associated organisms and modulation of ecosystem processes.

Examples and outcomes of foundation species loss 

A study conducted at the McKenzie Flats of the Sevilleta National Wildlife Refuge in New Mexico, a semiarid biome transition zone, observed the result of loss of a variety of different dominant and codominant foundation species of plants on the growth of other species. This transition zone consists of two Chihuahuan Desert species, black grama (Bouteloua eriopoda) and creosote bush (Larrea tridentata), and a shortgrass steppe species, blue grama (Bouteloua gracillis). Each species dominates an area with a specific soil environment. Black grama dominates sandy soils, while blue grama dominates in soils with high clay content, and creosote bush dominates fine-textured soil with surface gravel. This study noted that responses to the loss of foundation species is dependent on a variety of different factors from the ability of a species to recover to the climate conditions of the ecosystem to the patterns in dominance and explored the possible reasons for the outcomes of the study. The results indicated that in areas with just one dominant foundation species, its loss caused a shift in dominance to a mixed dominant community. For example, the creosote bush dominated shrubland saw a shift in dominance to 32% by other shrubs, 26% by perennial grasses, and 22% by perennial forbs following the removal of creosote bush. Another finding was that regardless of the community type and the species removed, the loss of foundation species resulted in an overall increase in black grama supporting the notion that the outcome is greatly affected by recovery ability of species removed or loss.

Another study observed the effects of loss of foundation eastern hemlocks (Tsuga canadensis) in a forest ecosystem. Eastern hemlocks are a foundation species in eastern North American forests, but have been threatened by the accidental introduction of woolly adelgid. This study observed the effects that a loss in eastern hemlocks would have on the populations of arthropods, such as ants, beetles, and spiders, since these species are known indicators of environmental change. The results found that in areas of hemlock removal, there was an overall increase and influx of arthropod species. Researchers suggested that this was due to an increase in open habitats from the loss of the hemlocks. The results of this hemlock study corroborated with those from the previous McKenzie Flats study discussed in that the loss of foundation species led to a proliferation of species diversity in the affected area. These results seem to contradict a long-standing belief that foundation species play a vital role in communities and ecosystems by creating habitats for organisms, suggesting that in some circumstances they bottleneck species diversity.

Foundation species play a vital role in structuring a community; however, this can be in a variety of different ways. The presence of a foundation species has the ability to either reduce or increase species diversity depending on its particular role in a specific ecosystem. The studies discussed highlighted examples in which foundation species limited species diversity in similar and differing taxa (the McKenzie Flats and eastern hemlock studies, respectively); however, there are many other examples in which removal of foundation species could decrease species diversity within the same or differing taxa.

See also

Keystone species
Indicator species
Flagship species
Ecological facilitation

References

Ecology